Bellavista is a railway station on the Monte Generoso railway, a rack railway that connects Capolago with the summit of Monte Generoso in the Swiss canton of Ticino. Bellavista is the principal intermediate station on the line, and at one time the junction point for the Tramway Bellavista.

Bellavista station 
The station has a passing loop and an additional siding. It is the principle intermediate station, and the normal passing point of uphill and downhill trains. The station incorporates a popular station buffet, a picnic area, and a children's play area. The environs of the station are wooded, and include views over Lake Lugano and the city of Lugano.

The station is served by the following passenger trains:

There is also road access from Mendrisio to Bellavista, the highest point on the mountain with such access. A hiking trail links Bellavista to the summit.

Tramway Bellavista 
In 1867, well before the railway opened, Carlo Pasta built a hotel near to the current location of the Bellavista station. The line was built to  gauge, and used a single, horse-drawn, tramcar. Sources differ on the closure date of the line, with both 1913 and 1938 being quoted.

The lean-to shed behind Bellavista station building, in which the line's tramcar was kept, can still be seen, as can parts of the trackbed. The hotel has since been demolished, and is now a picnic site.

References

External links 
 

Railway stations in Ticino
Bellavista